The 1983 Tour de Suisse was the 47th edition of the Tour de Suisse cycle race and was held from 14 June to 24 June 1983. The race started in Seuzach and finished in Zürich. The race was won by Sean Kelly of the Sem–France Loire team.

General classification

References

1983
Tour de Suisse
1983 Super Prestige Pernod